Ground Control is the fourth studio album by English drum and bass band Rudimental, released on 3 September 2021 through Asylum Records. It is the Rudimental’s final album to feature Amir Amor who left the band in October 2022.

Background and composition
In an interview with HMV and Rudimental member Piers Aggett, he talked about the writing process of Ground Control whilst in lockdown during the COVID-19 pandemic and stated that the album material started surfacing even before their third album Toast to Our Differences was released. Aggett said, "COVID was actually a bit of a blessing for us. Normally we tour all the time, certainly all summer, and it gave us a summer at home for the first time in a long time. We made the whole album in lockdown. A lot of the songs were actually written in 2018." He elaborated, "We went to Los Angeles and we did a bunch of writing out there. Lots of the songs are from those sessions. That’s the way we tend to work, we go on a trip, we write a lot and then it takes us a long while to actually work on the songs and finish them. The pandemic made us productive because suddenly there wasn't a gig at the weekend and we could really focus."

The album was described by the band as referencing from their earlier material but infused with more soul. Upon the release of the album, the band stated that the record is intended to be seen as a two-sided album - "side A touches on our roots, the pirate radio stations and influences we grew up with, and side B flows deeper into soul and darker textures and atmospheres."

Track listing

Notes
  signifies a co-producer
  signifies an additional producer
  signifies a vocal producer

Personnel
Rudimental
 Piers Aggett – drum programming (1–4, 8–11, 13–16), synthesizer (1–5, 7–11, 13–16), programming (5, 6), keyboards (12), bass synthesizer (16)
 Amir Amor – drum programming (1–5, 8–11, 13–16), guitar (1, 3, 5, 7, 8, 10–12, 14), bass (2, 4, 13, 15), programming (7), synthesizer (7, 9), keyboards (12, 16), percussion (16)
 Kesi Dryden – drum programming (1–5, 8, 10, 11, 13–16), synthesizer (2–5, 7–11, 13, 15, 16), programming (7), synthesizer programming (9), bass synthesizer (16)
 Leon Rolle – drum programming (1, 11, 14–16), keyboards, percussion (1–5, 8–11, 13–16); programming (7, 12), synthesizer (7)

Additional musicians

 Connor Bellis – programming (1), drum programming (4)
 Beth Aggett – backing vocals (2, 5, 8)
 Anne-Marie – backing vocals (2), vocals (9, 14)
 John Ryan – guitar (2)
 Kareen Lomax – vocals (2)
 Morgan – backing vocals (3), vocals (14)
 Taurean Antoine-Chagar – saxophone (3, 14)
 Harry Brown – trombone (3)
 Mark Crown – trumpet (3, 12, 14)
 Nørskov – vocals (3, 13)
 Hardy Caprio – vocals (4)
 Gigi Wens – vocals (4)
 Ian Burdge – cello (5)
 MJ Cole – drum programming, vocoder (5)
 Sally Herbert – string arrangement, violin (5)
 Josh Barry – vocals (5)
 S1mba – backing vocals (7)
 Renell Shaw – guitar (7, 12), backing vocals, bass (16)
 Jay Weathers – programming (7)
 Max Abrahams – drum programming (8, 16)
 Sam Newbold – saxophone (8, 13)
 Ella Henderson – vocals (8)
 Oliver Dene Jones – drum programming, synthesizer (9)
 Hamzaa – backing vocals (10), vocals (16)
 Sam Knowles – synthesizer (10), keyboards (12), drum programming (14, 15)
 Maverick Sabre – vocals (10)
 Kojey Radical – vocals (10)
 Redlight – drum programming, synthesizer (11)
 The Game – vocals (11)
 BackRoad Gee – vocals (11)
 D Double E – vocals (11)
 Tove Lo – backing vocals (13)
 Keeya Keys – backing vocals (13)
 Lowkey – vocals (15)
 RV – vocals (15)
 Natalie Maddix – choir direction, vocal arrangement (16)
 Oliver George Nobes Hutchinson – organ (16)
 Liza Jennings – vocal arrangement (16)
 House Gospel Choir – vocals (16)

Technical

 Kevin Grainger – mastering
 Greg Freeman – mixing
 Connor Bellis – engineering (all tracks), additional vocal recording (15)
 George Murphy – engineering, additional vocal recording (16)  
 Ryan Fletcher – additional vocal recording (3)

Charts

References

2021 albums
Asylum Records albums
Rudimental albums
Major Tom's albums